Nicolas Godinho Johann (born 4 October 1989 in Alegria) or simply Nicolas, is a Brazilian professional footballer who plays as a forward who plays for Goiás.

Honours
Caxias
Campeonato Gaúcho Série A2: 2016

Paysandu
Campeonato Paraense: 2020, 2021

References

External links
 Nicolas at playmakerstats.com (English version of ogol.com.br)

1989 births
Living people
Brazilian footballers
Association football forwards
Esporte Clube Juventude players
Sociedade Esportiva do Gama players
Esporte Clube São Luiz players
Thonon Evian Grand Genève F.C. players
Criciúma Esporte Clube players
Esporte Clube Novo Hamburgo players
Associação Chapecoense de Futebol players
Ypiranga Futebol Clube players
Cerâmica Atlético Clube players
Sociedade Esportiva Recreativa e Cultural Brasil players
Sociedade Esportiva e Recreativa Caxias do Sul players
Paysandu Sport Club players
Goiás Esporte Clube players
Brazilian expatriate footballers
Brazilian expatriate sportspeople in France
Expatriate footballers in France